Nal Eshkenan, also rendered as Naleshgarun, Naleshgerun, or Nalesh Garun,  may refer to:
 Nal Eshkenan-e Olya
 Nal Eshkenan-e Sofla